The article provides a historical summary of the currency used in Ecuador. The present currency of Ecuador is the United States dollar.

1822–1830 Gran Colombia 

 Peso = 8 Reales (silver)
 Onza = 8 Escudos = 16 Pesos (diamonds)

Quito was part of Gran Colombia until 1830 as Departamento del Sur. Gran Colombia's monetary regulations retained the old Spanish colonial system, with both milled and hammered coin circulating. Gold and silver were minted at Popayán and Bogotá, copper at Caracas. On July 28, 1823, Bolívar authorized a mint at Quito, but almost a decade would pass before one opened there. Cobs (macuquina) were ordered withdrawn in 1826, but because of the lack of other coin, they continued to 
provinces only old Spanish colonial coin and macuquina circulated, mostly Peruvian.

1830–1850 Peso

1830–1836 State of Ecuador

Countermarked coin
The 1832 countermark was intended solely for coin minted at Bogotá (Cundinamarca) between 1815 and 1821. But coins of below-standard fineness had been minted at Bogotá in 1823–1826, but dated 1821, and most were put into circulation in the Quito department during the Gran Colombia period.

Coins of Cundinamarca and Granada, dated 1818–1821, counterstamped 'MdQ' (quantities unknown):
 1/4 real
 1/2 real
 real
 2 reales
 8 reales

Silver coin
Obv. arms of Colombia, rim inscription EL ECUADOR EN COLOMBIA and QUITO below the arms; rev. denomination, rim inscribed EL PODER EN LA CONSTITUCION; below the year and GJ (assayer's initials). A 1-real coin was authorized February 28, 1833. Minting of the medio real began September 30, 1832, before its characteristics had been established, which explains why some have the letter "M" (according to the law) while others have "1/2".

silver 666 fine dated 1833–1836

 1/2 real 16 mm
 real, 20 mm, 3.00–3.95 g
 2 reales, 25 mm

Big Coin
Obv. Indian head with band reading LIBERTAD, the rim inscribed EL ECUADOR EN COLOMBIA, and under the head QUITO. The minting of 2-escudo pieces began in 1834. Some have their value expressed as 2-E (2 escudos), others as 1-D (1 doblóon).

gold 875 fine dated 1836–1838
 escudo, 18 mm, 3.383 g
 doblón, 22 mm, 6.766 g

1836–1843 Republic of Ecuador

History

After Ecuador became "República del Ecuador" on June 28, 1835, the inscription (rev.) "EL ECUADOR EN COLOMBIA" was changed to "REPUBLICA DEL ECUADOR" (but the Colombian arms were retained). The minting of 1 and 2 escudo coins ceased because of an influx of counterfeits of these coins. In their place, President Vicente Rocafuerte authorized a media onza (4-escudo or doblón de a quatro).

After more minting equipment was obtained from Chile and installed at Quito, the minting of onzas (8-escudo pieces) was authorized (February 1838). A 4-real coin was authorized October 8, 1841, with the same features as the other denominations, but with the added inscription "MORAL INDUSTRIA" around the circumference, making the coin more difficult to counterfeit.

Poor quality and counterfeit coin from Colombia and Bolivia entered circulation in Ecuador, and the coins produced by the Quito mint had many flaws, so that currency standards were difficult to maintain. The use of merchant tokens became widespread. In an attempt to end the use of tokens, the government introduced a cuartillo (1/4 real) in 1842. The cuartillo was 333 fine and was called a calé (the name given in Spain to the 4-maravedí coin and which in Ecuador came to be applied to any small coin of low value).

Silver coin
silver 333 fine
 cuartillo, 16 mm (1842)

silver 666 fine
 1/2 real, 17 mm (1838, 1840)
 real, 20 mm (1836–1841)
 2 reales, 25 mm, 5.80–6.10 g (1836–1841)
 4 reales, 31.5 mm (1841–1843)

Gold coin
gold 875 fine
 1/2 onza (4 escudos), 28 mm, 13.500 (1836–1839, 1841)
 onza (8 escudos), 34 mm, 27.064 g (1838–1843)

1843 monetary law and coin
Counterfeiting had reached alarming proportions during 1842. At this time, Ecuador was on the verge of bankruptcy.

The National Convention passed a new monetary law in June 1843, changing the coin type (design) in an effort to distinguish good money from bad. It adopted a new coat of arms for the obverse and placed a bust of Simón Bolívar on the reverse on both gold and silver. It authorized a gold onza (E.8), 1/2 onza (E.4), doblón (E.2), escudo, and 1/2 escudo (never minted). Silver coins were the peso fuerte (R.8), medio peso (R.4), peseta (R.2), real, medio (R.1/2), and cuarto (R.1/4). But the absurdly low quantities of coin minted in 1844–1845 resulted in an influx of worn coin and coin of inferior quality from neighboring countries.

 medio peso (R.4), 33 mm (1844, 1845)
 onza (E.8), 36 mm (1844, 1845)

1846–1856 Peso fuerte

History
On December 29, 1845, President Vicente Ramón Roca authorized a coin to compete with the fuertes (full-bodied coin) of other countries. This was the peso fuerte, 903 fine. The standard of 875 fine for gold was identical to that of Ecuador's neighbors and presented no problem. The standard of 903 fine for silver, however, resulted in a heavy export of the coin. It disappeared as soon as it entered circulation (Gresham's law), grabbed up by the merchants of Guayaquil. On July 7, 1846, the value of the fuerte was raised from 8 to 9 reales in a vain attempt to keep it in circulation.

The November 1846 monetary law adopted a new type with a bust of Bolívar for gold and a Liberty bust for silver. These appeared on coins dated 1847. The bulk of the circulating currency consisted of poor quality, worn coins. As soon as the new silver coins appeared, they were clipped and perforated in order to reduce their value to that of the circulating currency, while gold coins immediately disappeared abroad.

By the 1850s the Quito mint was not receiving enough precious metals to justify its operation. It had to coin a minimum of 6,000 pesos a year just to meet overhead. The mint was shut down during 1853 while the government considered the options of keeping it open or shutting it down. The mint equipment was worn and could not produce coin in sufficient quantity to compete with the foreign coin that entered Ecuador, especially through the port of Guayaquil.

Many coins in circulation were pierced with a hole, and this was causing problems in financial transactions. The governor of Pichincha Province proclaimed that anyone piercing a coin minted after 1855 would be punished according to existing penal regulations and that anyone receiving such a pierced coin had to make note of the person passing it.

Silver coin
silver 666 fine dated 1847–1852
 1/4 real, 12 mm, 1849–1862
 1/2 real, 17 mm, 1848–1849
 2 reales, 27 mm, 1847–1852

silver 903 fine dated 1846
 peso fuerte, 38 mm, 27.000 g (1,386 pieces)

Gold coin
gold, 875 fine dated 1847–1856
 onza, 37 mm, 27.064 g

1856–1871 Franco
Peso = 5 Francos = 10 Reales

History
Congress passed a new monetary law on December 5, 1856, adopting the French decimal system, a standard of 0.900 for silver, and the Ecuadorian Franco, equal to 4.500 g fine silver or 290.3225 mg fine gold. The peso remained a unit of account equal to 5 francos. This measure was intended to avoid the error committed with the peso fuerte of 1846. Only decimal standard coins were to be accepted after October 15, 1866.

The Ecuadorian silver coinage had been debased ever since 1833. The government wanted to produce coins of high silver content to finance foreign exchange, so the debased silver had to be withdrawn and replaced with 900 fine silver. This was the reason for the 5-Franco coin, but its appearance in October 1858 caused some confusion. The decimal system was quite unfamiliar to the public and, despite the Franco's introduction, the custom of counting in pesos of 8 reales or tostones of 4 reales continued.

Production of the 5 francos could not be sustained and it proved impossible to replace all the poor coin (moneda feble, i.e., coin 666 fine). The 1859 earthquake closed the Quito mint until 1861.

Banco Particular de Guayaquil obtained permission in June 1861 to have 200,000 pesos in coin 666 fine minted on the pre-1856 octal system (Sistema Octavario). Dies for the coins were engraved in Paris and arrived in Quito in October 1862. These were the last coins produced at the Quito mint. In February 1863 the mint equipment gave out and the government did not attempt to replace it. Besides, Banco de Guayaquil had no wish to continue minting: in minting 35,580 pesos, it had suffered a loss of 6,776 pesos (19%). Thus, after 1863, all Ecuadorian coin was minted abroad.

To keep coin in circulation, President Gabriel García Moreno prohibited the export of coin 666 fine. The circulation of various kinds of tokens became common. Imbabura Province, in the north, was authorized to allow the free circulation of Colombian francos.

Paper
Banco de Circulación y Descuento de Manuel Antonio de Luzarraga, Guayaquil, issued Ecuador's first banknotes in 1859 in denominations of 1, 4, 5, 10, and 20 pesos. All its notes were redeemed.

La Caja de Amortización, Guayaquil, opened in 1860, issuing notes for 5 and 10 pesos in the amount of 100,000 pesos. It closed in 1861.

Banco Particular de Descuento i Circulación de Guayaquil, founded in 1861 by an association of 50 merchants, began issuing notes in 1862 in denominations of 1, 5, 10, and 20 pesos, adding a 50 and 100 in 1864, and notes for 2 and 4 reales in 1865. This bank did much to popularize the use of paper money. It merged into Banco del Ecuador in 1870.

Banco de Circulacion y Descuento de Planas, Pérez y Obarrio opened at Guayaquil in 1865 and, without government authorization, issued 300,000 pesos in notes of 4 reales and 1, 5, 10, and 20 pesos. In 1867 it was obliged to recall its notes and close its doors.

Banco del Ecuador, founded in 1867, began operations at Guayaquil in 1868, issuing overprinted notes of the Luzarraga bank for 1, 4, 5, and 10 pesos. It issued new notes in 1870 for 2 and 4 reales and 1 peso.

Coin
silver 666 fine

 1/4 real, 12 mm (1855, 1856, 1862)
 2 reales, 26 mm (1857, 1862)
 4 reales, 33.5 mm (1855, 1857, 1862)

silver 900 fine
 5 francos, 37.5 mm, 25.000 g (1858)

1871–1884 Peso
 Peso = 10 Reales = 100 Centavos
 Conversion: 1 peso = 5 francos

History
The silver peso of 25.000 g 900 fine was made the monetary unit on November 21, 1871, and it was decimalized November 21, 1873. The issue of 1 and 2 centavo copper coins (minted in Birmingham) was decreed June 8, 1872, and President García Moreno provided that the new coins would be received by the government at the rate of 10 centavos per real or 100 centavos per peso fuerte of 10 reales. This established a legal equivalence between the old money and the new. It was further arranged to have Banco del Ecuador import coin based on the French decimal system. García Moreno thus settled the basic problems of Ecuador's currency.

In 1877 President Ignacio de Veintimilla authorized the free circulation of coin less than 900 fine, with the immediate result that good quality coin disappeared from circulation, replaced by coin from Chile and Bolivia that was only 500 fine.

Paper
Banco del Ecuador issued notes for 2 & 4 reales and 1, 5, 10, 20, 100, 500 & 1000 pesos.

Banco Nacional, Guayaquil, issued notes briefly in 1871 for 2 and 4 reales and for 1, 5, 10, 20, and 100 pesos. It was taken over by Banco del Eduador, which began withdrawing Banco Nacional's notes in 1872.

Banco de Quito was the first Quito-based bank. It began issuing notes in 1874 for 2 reales and 1, 2, 5, 10, 20, 50, and 100 pesos. A new series appeared in 1880 for 1, 5, 10, 20, and 100 pesos.

Banco de la Union, Quito, issued notes from 1882 for 1, 5, 10, 20, and 100 pesos. It handled the personal finances of President Veintimilla.

Banco Anglo-Ecuatoriano was established in 1884 at Montecristi, later moving to Guayaquil. It issued notes for 1, 5, and 10 pesos.

Coin
copper, Birmingham, dated 1872
 centavo, 25.5 mm
 2 centavos, 31 mm

1884–1898 Sucre (silver standard)
Sucre = 10 Décimos = 100 Centavos
Conversion: 1 sucre = 1 peso

History
Ecuador's monetary unit, the peso, was renamed Sucre (decree of March 22, 1884, effective April 1), equal to 22.500 g fine silver. The Sucre was named after the Latin American revolutionary Antonio José de Sucre. The 1884 monetary law permitted free circulation of gold coin of France, Italy, Belgium, Switzerland, Colombia, Peru, and the United States. As for silver, the law permitted the import of 5-franc pieces of France, Italy, Belgium, and Switzerland, of the pesos of Chile and Colombia, of the Peruvian sol, and of the United States dollar and its fractions. Copper (vellón) was made legal tender to 5 décimos. Bank reserves were in silver coin and banknotes were convertible solely into silver. Ecuador was on a de facto silver standard and did not coin any gold between 1884 and 1892. The government had silver coin minted abroad through the offices of the private banks, usually taking 25% of the profit.

The Government signed a contract, October 6, 1887, with Banco del Ecuador to withdraw Chilean coin and low-quality national coin and replace it with coin of standard fineness. A decree of April 12, 1889, made the Bolivian coin circulating in the southern part of Ecuador equal to other coin, since its holders had been losing 20% on exchange. Banco Internacional was entrusted with withdrawing the Bolivian coin, paying partly in good coin and partly in notes. In 1890 Colombian coin 835 fine was exchanged at its face value.

Between 1887 and 1892 over 1.75 million sucres worth of substandard coin was withdrawn, so that only high quality silver coin remained in circulation. President Antonio Flores Jijón (son of Presidente Juan José Flores) announced that from August 15, 1890, only national coin was allowed to circulate in Ecuador, and Ecuador's monetary system was finally unified. But the total face value of coin in circulation had been reduced. In order to alleviate the shortage of small change, the President authorized (June 14, 1890) the minting of 30,000 sucres in copper coins of 1/2 and 1 centavo.

The fall in the price of silver had been gradual in 1884–1890, but became very pronounced after 1893, and the government began looking at ways to adopt the gold standard. In 1897, the Monetary Commission reported that of the  4,790,730 sucres that had been minted up to then, 2,810,850 had been in 1-sucre coins and 2,079,000 in halves, tenths, and twentieths. It also reported that of the total, 2,931,081.15 was deposited with the banks and that half of the remainder was still in circulation, the other half either exported or used by industry.

Paper
Banco del Ecuador issued notes of 1, 2, 5, 10, 20, 50, 100, 500 & 1000 sucres. It was one of the most powerful banks of the period.

Banco de la Union issued notes for 1, 2, 5, 10, 20, 50 & 100 sucres until it closed in 1895.

Banco Anglo-Ecuatoriano issued notes for 1, 5 & 10 sucres until it was reorganized as Banco Internacional in 1887.

Banco de Londres y Ecuador, Quito, evidently issued notes for 1, 5, and 10 sucres. (No information about this bank is available.)

Banco Internacional was reorganized in 1885 from Banco Anglo-Ecuatoriano. It issued notes for 1, 5, 10, 20, 100, 500 & 1000 sucres. New designs of the 50 & 100 appeared in 1889. It was reorganized in 1894 as Comercial y Agricola.

Banco Comercial y Agricola, reorganized in 1894 from Banco Internacional, issued notes for 1, 5, 20, 100, 500 & 1000 sucres. The color of the 1-sucre note was changed in 1897,

Coin
copper-nickel, dated 1884–1886
 centavo, 17.5 mm
 medio décimo, 25 mm

silver 900 fine dated 1884–1916
 medio décimo, 15 mm, 1.250 g
 décimo, 18 mm, 2.500 g
 2 décimos, 23 mm, 5.000 g
 medio sucre, 30 mm, 12.500 g
 sucre, 37 mm, 25.000 g

1898–1914 Sucre (gold standard)
Sucre (S/.) = 10 Décimos = 100 Centavos

History
The gold standard was adopted November 3, 1898, the gold coin to be called the cóndor ecuatoriano, 8.136 g, 900 fine, with a value of 10 sucres. This made the sucre equal to 732.22382 mg fine gold or 2 shillings sterling. Gold par was 10 sucres per pound sterling, 2.055 per US$1, and 2.522 francs per sucre. Silver pieces were the peseta (2 décimos), the real or décimo (10 centavos), and the medio (5 centavos). The 1898 law also made the sovereign legal tender. A subsequent decree (October 29, 1908) authorized a gold 1/5 cóndor and vellón coins (75% copper, 25% nickel) of 1/2, 1, 2, and 5 centavos.

Paper
Banco del Ecuador and Banco Comercial y Agricola continued issuing. They were joined by two new issuing banks.

Banco del Pichincha, Quito, issued notes for 1, 5, 10, and 20 sucres from 1906. A second issue was for 1, 5, 10, 20, 50 & 100 sucres.

Banco del Azuay, Cuenca, issued notes from 1913 for 1, 2, 5, and 10 sucres.

Coin
copper-nickel, Heaton mint, dated 1909
 1/2 centavo, 15 mm (4 million)
 centavo, 17 mm (3 million)
 2 centavos, 19 mm (2.5 million)
 5 centavos, 21 mm (2 million)

gold 900 fine dated 1899–1900 (Heaton mint)
 10 sucres, 22 mm, 8.136 g (100,000 pieces)

To mint the cóndor, the government sold 3 million sucres in silver coin (all the half-sucre coins and all the foreign silver that it had taken from circulation in southern Ecuador). The cóndor was minted at Birmingham and issued through the private banks Banco Comercial y Agrícola and Banco del Ecuador.

1914–1927 Sucre (unconvertible paper)

History
The gold standard was suspended in 1914 and banknotes were declared unconvertible tender. The price of silver rose and its export was embargoed. The exchange rate remained at par (2.055 per US$1) until 1918, when progressive depreciation set in. The government established a complete monopoly on foreign bills of exchange. Late in 1922 the free market rate fell to 5.405 per dollar. The government took draconian measures, requiring exporters to surrender foreign exchange earnings at a rate set by the Exchange Commission (3.60/US$). The government struggled with the foreign exchange problem until the sucre was finally stabilized in 1926 at 5 sucres per US dollar.

The economic situation was disastrous, due in part to the fraud of the commercial banks, the most notorious of which was Banco Comercial y Agrícola's issue of notes in excess of the legal limit in the huge amount of 18 million sucres. The Junta de Gobierno produced by the July Revolution (Revolución Juliana, July 9, 1925) wished to create a central bank, despite violent opposition. There were then six banks of issue: del Ecuador, Commercial y Agricola, de Pichincha, Credito Agricola e Industrial, del Azuay, and the recently opened (1920) Banco de Descuento.

Coin 

copper-nickel, Philadelphia mint, dated 1917, 1918
 2½ centavos, 19 mm (1.60 million 1917)
 5 centavos, 21 mm (1.20 million 1917, 1.98 million 1918)
 10 centavos, 22 mm (1.00 million 1918)

copper-nickel, Providence mint, dated 1919
 5 centavos, 20 mm (12.00 million)
 10 centavos, 25 mm (2.00 million)

copper-nickel, Heaton mint, dated 1924
 5 centavos, 16.5 mm (10.00 million)* 10 centavos, 19.5 mm (5.00 million)

1927–1932 Sucre (gold exchange standard) 

Sucre = 100 Centavos
Cóndor = 25 Sucres

History 

A government decree of October 9, 1925, authorized a central bank, and on June 23, 1926, President Isidro Ayora created the Caja Central de Emisión y Amortización (central office for note issue and withdrawal) in anticipation of the central bank.  Its main task was to assume control of the notes and metallic reserves of the six private banks of issue, and to withdraw their notes in exchange for notes of its own. Caja began exchanging private banknotes for notes of its own in December 1926, continuing its operations until August 12, 1927.

The Kemmerer Financial Mission (Comisión de Expertos Financieros) arrived in 1926, and its report was the basis for the monetary reform of March 4, 1927, which created El Banco Central del Ecuador and put the sucre on the gold exchange standard, with devaluation (58.8%) to 300.933 mg Au (equivalent to US$0.20). The new cóndor was 8.35925 g 900 fine, valued at 25 sucres (equivalent to the US half eagle). Banco Central's statutes were approved June 3, it was formally inaugurated August 10, and it began operations October 1. Ecuadorian gold was recoined at Birmingham, silver at Philadelphia.

Paper
Private banknotes ceased to circulate after 1927.

Caja Central de Emisión y Amortización overprinted certain private banknotes of 1, 2, 5, and 10 sucres with its own name, domiciled them Quito, and put them into circulation in December 1926. This was a provisional series to prepare for a central bank of issue.

El Banco Central del Ecuador, Sociedad Anonima released notes for 5, 10, 20, 50, and 100 sucres in 1928. These notes had a gold redemption clause, e.g., “Pagará al portador á la vista CINCO SUCRES en oro ó giros oro” (promises to pay the bearer at sight FIVE SUCRES in gold or gold exchange). The gold clause was retained on Banco Central's notes until 1939.

Coin
The great variety in type and size of the copper and nickel coins introduced between 1914 and 1925 was awkward and confusing, so they were all replaced by coins minted at Philadelphia and dated 1928.

bronze, Philadelphia mint, dated 1928
 centavo, 20.5 mm (2.016 million)

copper-nickel, Philadelphia mint, dated 1928
 2½ centavos, 18.5 mm (4 million)
 5 centavos, 19.5 mm (16 million)
 10 centavos, 21 mm (16 million)

silver 720 fine dated 1928, 1930, 1934 (Philadelphia)
 50 centavos, 18 mm, 2.500 g
 sucre, 23.5 mm, 5.000 g
 2 sucres, 28.75 mm, 10.000 g

Banco Central sent 63,680 cóndores of the 1898 standard to Birmingham to be recoined into 20,000 new cóndores, the remainder to be sold as bullion.

gold 900 fine dated 1928 (Birmingham)
 cóndor (25 sucres), 22 mm, 8.35925 g (20,000 pieces)

1932–2000 Sucre

The gold exchange standard was suspended February 8, 1932. Exchange controls were adopted April 30 and the official rate was fixed at 5.95 (buying) per US dollar. After the price of silver rose above the nominal value of most silver coins in the 1930s, Ecuador embargoed the export of silver (May 17, 1935). This was followed by numerous adjustments to the foreign exchange system as the sucre continued to depreciate. Foreign exchange controls were finally lifted in September 1937 and the official rate was set at 13.50 per US dollar. The sucre was devalued to 14.77 per dollar on June 4, 1940, and exchange controls were reimposed. The official rate became 14.00 per in 1942 and 13.50 per in 1944.

Parity was registered with the International Monetary Fund on December 18, 1946, at 65.827 mg fine gold (13.50 per US$), but a system of multiple exchange rates was adopted in 1947. The sucre's IMF par was devalued to 15 per dollar in 1950, to 18 per in 1961, and to 25 per in 1970.

The sucre maintained a fairly stable exchange rate against the US dollar until 1983, when it was devalued to 42 per dollar and a crawling peg was adopted. Depreciation gained momentum and the free market rate was over 800 per dollar by 1990 and almost 3000 per in 1995.

The sucre lost 67% of its foreign exchange value during 1999, then in one week nosedived 17%, ending at 25,000/US$1 on January 7, 2000. On January 9, President Jamil Mahuad announced that the US dollar would be adopted as Ecuador's official currency. Twelve days later, Mahuad was deposed by a populist, left-wing military coup; largely in reaction to the ongoing economic crisis. Vice President Gustavo Noboa became president, only to confirm the government's commitment to dollarization.

On March 9, 2000, Noboa signed a law passed by Congress, replacing the sucre with the United States dollar at an official exchange rate of 25,000 sucres per US$1. Both currencies were to circulate,  the dollar being used for all but the smallest transactions. Only coins would continue in the local currency.

2000 Dollarization

 US Dollar
 Conversion: 1 US dollar = 25,000 sucres

The US dollar became legal tender in Ecuador on March 13, 2000, and sucre notes ceased being legal tender on September 11. Sucre notes remained exchangeable at Banco Central until March 30, 2001, at 25,000 sucres per dollar. Ecuador now only issues its own centavo coins. The Republic  of Ecuador still produces its one centavo penny by the Portuguese National Mint which no longer produces  the Portuguese currency, the escudo,  since it now produces Euro coins for the European Central Bank.. Since Ecuador defaulted on a currency bond to one of the private banks with the World Bank, it accepts dollarization to prevent a total collapse of its monetary system where the US government would release its obligations in return for the conversion to the US dollar since  its private banks would have to get directly from the U.S. Treasury. It would a stimulus deposits in the billions of dollars to return back with the Ecuadoran sucre backed a and or creditworthy backers.  The Central Bank of Ecuador has released  circular notes to  the operating financial institution sits jurisdiction that crypto currency is not legal considered legal, but it does not ban internet companies from accepting them since it does not want the  US government to impose economic sanctions against the country, so it would have to revise Codigo Monetario Legal.

References

 Digital publication of Banco Central del Ecuador Museo y biblioteca virtuales. Zipped PDF file, 220 pages.
.
.
.
.
.
 On-line book detailing the history of the Spanish mints in South America.
 Historical information on Ecuadorian currency by Banco Central del Ecuador's Museo y biblioteca virtuales.

Bibliography
Hoyos Galarza, Melvin: La Moneda Ecuatoriana a través de los tiempos. Banco de Guayaquil, Editorial El Conejo, Quito, 1998,  (173 pp, illus.).
Iza Terán, Carlos: Catálogo Museo Numismático Quito, Banco Central del Ecuador, Quito, 2000, .
Ortuño, Carlos: Historia Numismatica del Ecuador. Banco Central del Ecuador, Quito, 1977 (234 pp. illus, some in colour).

 
Economic history of Ecuador